Pierre Fons (16 July 1880 in Toulouse – 23 April 1917 in Cambo-les-Bains) was a French poet, novelist and essayist.

Biography 
Born from a family of scholars, he obtained a law degree in Toulouse. He contributed to many magazines in the south of France. At 23, he published a volume of elegies, L'Heure amoureuse et funéraire, foreworded by Émile Pouvillon, a work distinguished by the Académie française. Maître es Jeux at the Académie des Jeux Floraux of Toulouse, he was part of a Toulouse school under the aegis of Marc Lafargue. Author of several collections of poems but also of a series of essays published under the title Le réveil de Pallas, Fons died during the First World War at age 36.

A small part of his library has been kept at the University of Perpignan since 2018.

Works

Essays 
.

.

Poetry

Novel

Bibliography 
 Robert Sabatier, La poésie du XXe siècle. I, tradition et évolution Paris, Éditions Albin Michel, 1982
 Raoul Davray & Henry Rigal, Anthologie des poètes du Midi : morceaux choisis accompagnés de notices biographiques et d’un essai de bibliographie; Paris, Ollendorff, 1908 Anthologie des poètes du Midi on Gallica

References 

1880 births
1917 deaths
Writers from Toulouse
20th-century French poets
French military personnel killed in World War I